Joseph Healy (August 21, 1776 – October 10, 1861) was an American politician, farmer, innkeeper, and a United States Representative from New Hampshire.

Early life
Born in Newton, Middlesex County, Massachusetts, Healy completed his preparatory studies, and worked at farming and as an inn keeper.

Career
Healy became a member of the New Hampshire Senate in 1824.

Elected by a 4,000 majority over Federalist, Ezekiel Webster, as an Adams candidate to the Nineteenth and  Twentieth Congresses, Healy served as a United States Representative from the state of New Hampshire from (March 4, 1825 – March 3, 1829).

After leaving Congress, Healy was a member of the New Hampshire Executive Council from 1829-1832. He resumed agricultural pursuits and the hotel business.

Death
Healy died in Washington, Sullivan County, New Hampshire on October 10, 1861 (age 85 years, 50 days). He is interred at Old Cemetery, Washington, New Hampshire.

Family life
Son of John Healy and Mary Wight Healy, he married Ruth Jaquith on December 21, 1801, and their son, Harvey was born December 24, 1802. After her death on June 19, 1807, he married Sally Copeland on February 2, 1808, and they had two daughters, Clara and Louisa; and three sons, John Plummer Healy, Langdon Healy, and Sullivan Wight Healy.

References

External links

1776 births
1861 deaths
Members of the United States House of Representatives from New Hampshire
Politicians from Newton, Massachusetts
New Hampshire National Republicans
National Republican Party members of the United States House of Representatives
People from Sullivan County, New Hampshire